The following is a list of notable music events and releases that occurred in 2010 in the United States.

Events

January
1 – Frontman Chris Cornell announces the reunion of Soundgarden.
Drummer Travis Barker announced that the Transplants would reunite for a new album and tour.
7 – Lady Gaga becomes the first artist in the survey's 17-year history to send her first five singles to number one on the Billboard Pop Songs chart with her single "Bad Romance".
11 – System of a Down bassist Shavo Odadjian makes a Twitter entry: "Are u guys ready for System???", which led to speculation of a reunion. However, weeks later, frontman Serj Tankian stated that System of a Down's hiatus is not over yet while adding: "We always have offers to play, from festivals and stuff, but we have not decided to do anything as of yet".
13 – R&B Soul legend Teddy Pendergrass dies at age 59.
18 – The surviving members of Sublime settle their lawsuit over use of the band's name. The new version of Sublime (featuring Rome Ramirez, Eric Wilson and Bud Gaugh) now performs together as Sublime with Rome.
 22 – Hope for Haiti Now telethon. Featuring performances from Wyclef Jean, Christina Aguilera, Beyoncé, Madonna, Bruce Springsteen, Jennifer Hudson, Mary J. Blige, Shakira, Sting, Alicia Keys, Dave Matthews, Neil Young, John Legend, Justin Timberlake, Stevie Wonder, Justin Bieber, Taylor Swift, Emeline Michel, Keith Urban, Kid Rock, Sheryl Crow, Coldplay, Bono, The Edge, Jay-Z, and Rihanna.
 27 – Hope for Haiti Now becomes the first digital-only album to top Billboard 200 albums chart and the largest pre-order album on iTunes until broken in 2012 by Madonna's album MDNA. The album sold 171,000 copies in two days of release and since then became available on Amazon.com and Rhapsody.
 29 – The Red Hot Chili Peppers make their live comeback with new guitarist, Josh Klinghoffer, paying tribute to Neil Young at MusiCares.
 31 – The 52nd Annual Grammy Awards were held at the Staples Center in Los Angeles, California.Beyoncé breaks a record, winning 6 Grammys in one night, including Song of The Year for "Single Ladies (Put A Ring on It)". Taylor Swift wins 4 Grammys, including Album of The Year for Fearless. At just 20 years old Swift became the youngest ever winner of Album of the Year.

February
 4 – Justice Jacobson ruled Larrikin's copyright had been infringed because the Men at Work song "Down Under" reproduced "a substantial part of "Kookaburra"".
12 –  The remake of the 1985 song "We Are The World" for victims of the 2010 Haiti earthquake debuts during the opening ceremonies of the 2010 Winter Olympics.
14 – Doug Fieger, frontman of The Knack, dies of cancer at the age of 57.
 16 – Zoli Téglás (of Ignite) officially becomes the new singer of Pennywise, replacing Jim Lindberg who left last August.
18 – The charity single "We Are the World 25 for Haiti" debuted at No. 2 on Billboard Hot 100 singles chart with 267,000 digital downloads and debuted at No. 1 on Billboard Hot Digital Songs chart.

March
 March 15 – Rock and Roll Hall of Fame inductions, Waldorf Astoria Hotel, NYC.
Lady Gaga becomes the first artist in the survey's 17-year history to send her first six singles to number-one (let alone six consecutive singles) on Billboard Pop Songs chart when her single "Telephone" jumped to number one.
17–21 – South By South West Festival takes place in Austin, Texas.
 18 – Rihanna's "Rude Boy" reaches No. 1 on the Billboard Hot 100, becoming her sixth no. 1 tying her fifth among females to reach no. 1 in the US, and making her the female with the most no. 1 singles since 2000.
20 – Jughead's Revenge perform their first reunion show at the Scotland Yard Pub in Canoga Park, California.

April
 1 – Canadian teen pop/R&B singer Justin Bieber debuts at No. 1 on the Billboard 200 after the release of his latter debut studio album My World 2.0. At the age of sixteen makes him the youngest solo male act to top the chart since 1963 when Stevie Wonder did with The 12 Year Old Genius, and the first artist to occupy two top five spots on the chart since Nelly in 2004. With the album, Bieber also became the second youngest artist overall to achieve the number one, only being beaten out by a fifteen-year-old Miley Cyrus in 2008 with Breakout.
14 – Type O Negative singer and bassist Peter Steele dies of heart failure at age 48.
18 – The 45th Annual Academy of Country Music Awards took place in Las Vegas. Carrie Underwood became the first female in history to win Entertainer of the Year twice, as well as consecutively.
19 – Gangstarr emcee Guru (rapper) suffered a heart attack, went into a coma, and died at age 48.
20 – Sublime with Rome, the new version of the defunct ska punk band with the same name, began their first world tour together, with possible new material to follow.

May
4 – Bone Thugs-n-Harmony released their reunion album with all original five members entitled Uni5: The World's Enemy.
 – Deftones released their first studio album in nearly four years, Diamond Eyes. It is their first album without original bassist Chi Cheng following his November 2008 car crash which eventually led to his death in April 2013.
11 – Social Distortion sign a deal with Epitaph Records, who would release the band's first album since 2004's Sex, Love and Rock 'n' Roll in the fall. The album's release would later be delayed to January 2011.
22-23 – Rock on the Range in Columbus, Ohio sets its festival attendance record with over 60,000 attendees over the two-day event.
24 – Slipknot bassist Paul Gray dies in an Iowa hotel room from an accidental overdose
26 – Lee DeWyze is crowned winner of the ninth season of American Idol while Crystal Bowersox is named runner-up.

June
 4 – Christina Aguilera released her fourth studio album Bionic, and debuts No. 3 on the Billboard 200, charting within the top ten, the album became Aguilera's fifth straight top ten album, selling 110,000 copies in its first week. Bionic is the first studio album in four years since Back to Basics (2006).
15 – Devo releases Something for Everybody, their first album in 20 years.
21 – Rap superstar Eminem releases his seventh album Recovery in the U.S. which spent seven weeks at number one on billboard's top 200 and was the top selling album of 2010.
 29 – Drake is sued by Playboy Enterprises over the use of the 1974 song "Fallin' In Love" by Hamilton, Joe Frank & Reynolds in Drake's 2009 hit "Best I Ever Had." Playboy, which owns the rights to "Fallin' In Love," claims Drake used the song's sample without permission and is seeking to claim any profits made from the Drake single.

July
 6 – Enrique Iglesias released his first bilingual album Euphoria with contained equal amount of original English and Spanish tracks with two different singles successfully released to English and Latin formats simultaneously.
 7 – Due to poor sales and possibly a decline in ratings and interest in this season's installment, the accompanying "American Idols LIVE! Tour 2010" cancels eight of its 38 shows.
Former Beatle Ringo Starr and his eleventh All-Starr Band perform at Radio City Music Hall for his seventieth birthday. During the closing song, "With a Little Help from My Friends" into "Give Peace a Chance", there were the following special guests: Steven Van Zandt, Nils Lofgren, Billy Squier, Men at Work's Colin Hay, Dr. John, Ray Davies, his son and The Who drummer, Zak Starkey and Yoko Ono. His grandsons came out and gave him a birthday cake Ludwig drum set. Just when he thought the show was over, Paul McCartney came out and performed the Beatles classic, "Birthday".
13 – Korn's ninth studio album, Korn III: Remember Who You Are, debuts at number 2 on the Billboard 200 with 63,000 copies sold in its first week. Former fill-in drummer Ray Luzier is appointed as a permanent member of the band, confirming David Silveria's departure in 2006.

August
 4 – Taylor Swift's lead single, "Mine" leaks and later Big Machine Record releases it on iTunes, becoming No. 1 after only 5 hours. It set a record for the fastest climbing song to number one.

September
12 – Lady Gaga sweeps the Video Music Awards, winning 8 awards, 7 for her "Bad Romance" video, and Best Collaboration for her song "Telephone" with Beyoncé. Gaga also gave an acceptance speech for Video of the Year in a dress made entirely of meat, she also announced the title of her third album, Born This Way which was released in May 2011. Lady Gaga was nominated for 13 VMA awards, the most in the show's history, and another 5 nominations for her contribution to Beyoncé's "Video Phone". Also, Justin Bieber won the award for Best New Artist, making him the youngest person to ever win a VMA.

October
5 – Chiodos released Illuminaudio, their only studio album to feature Brandon Bolmer (Yesterdays Rising) on lead vocals.

November
10 – The 44th Annual CMA Awards took place at the Bridgestone Arena in Nashville.
11 – The 11th Annual Latin Grammy Awards took place at the Mandalay Bay Events Center in Las Vegas.
21 – At the 2010 American Music Awards, Justin Bieber won all four of his nominations, including the award for Artist of The Year, becoming the youngest person in the show's 37-year history to win the award at 16.

December
9 – Jim Morrison, the former lead singer of The Doors, is granted a posthumous pardon, 39 years after his death. The pardon relates to a six-month prison sentence for indecent exposure handed to Morrison in 1969, following a performance in Miami earlier that year. Morrison had appealed his sentence, and died in 1971 without the matter being legally resolved.
18 – Josh and Zac Farro announce their exit from the band Paramore.

Major Music Awards

53rd Grammy Awards

 Record of the Year: Lady Antebellum – Need You Now
 Album of the Year: Arcade Fire – The Suburbs
 Song of the Year: Lady Antebellum – Need You Now
 Best New Artist: Esperanza Spalding

American Music Awards of 2010

 Artist of the Year – Justin Bieber
 T-Mobile Breakthrough Artist – Justin Bieber

2010 MTV Video Music Awards

 Video of the Year: Lady Gaga – Bad Romance
 Best New Artist: Justin Bieber – Baby

34th NAACP Image Awards

 Outstanding Album: Arcade Fire – The Suburbs
 Outstanding Song: Lady Antebellum – Need You Now
 Outstanding Music Video: Katy Perry – Firework
 Outstanding New Artist – Marina & the Diamonds
 Outstanding Contribution to Music – Neil Young

Country Music Association Awards

 Entertainer of the Year – Brad Paisley
 Song of the Year: Miranda Lambert – The House That Built Me
 Single of the Year: Lady Antebellum – Need You Now
 Album of the Year: Miranda Lambert – Revolution
 New Artist of the Year – Zac Brown Band

Bands formed

 BadBadNotGood
 Bastille
 Black Cards
 The Black Pacific
 Cali Swag District
 Car Seat Headrest
 Chastity Belt
 Cults
 The Damned Things
 Deafheaven
 Death Grips
 D.R.U.G.S.
 Disclosure
 Eagulls
 Flatbush Zombies
 Florida Georgia Line
 Friends
 Gayngs
 How To Destroy Angels
 Joanna Gruesome
 Joywave
 JR JR
 The Julie Ruin
 Karmin
 Lord Huron
 Low Cut Connie
 Majical Cloudz
 MKTO
 The Mowgli's
 Niki and the Dove
 Noel Gallagher's High Flying Birds
 Of Monsters and Men
 One Direction
 Parquet Courts
 Porches
 Public Service Broadcasting
 Purity Ring
 Real Friends
 Rudimental
 Steve Taylor & The Perfect Foil
 The Struts
 Tedeschi Trucks Band
 TEEN
 Times of Grace
 Toy
 Unknown Mortal Orchestra
 Vacationer
 Whirr
 Widowspeak
 Wild Flag
 Wolf Alice
 WZRD

Bands reformed

 Adema
 Alabama
 Allister
 Autopsy
 Bone Thugs-n-Harmony
 Bush
 Cap'n Jazz (touring only)
 The Cars
 The Dismemberment Plan (touring only)
 Dixie Chicks (touring only)
 The Dresden Dolls
 Fuel
 Guided by Voices (touring only)
 Hole
 Jughead's Revenge (touring only)
 Kumbia Kings
 Murderdolls
 Pavement (touring only)
 Piebald (touring only)
 Revis
 Scars on Broadway
 Something Corporate
 Soundgarden
 Supercute!
 Supertramp
 Swans
 System of a Down (touring in 2011)
 The Receiving End of Sirens
 TLC
 Transplants
 Ugly Kid Joe
 Vatican Commandos
 Vendetta Red
 Yellowcard

Bands on hiatus
 1997
 Doves
 Fall Out Boy (Hiatus reconfirmed by band members in February after rumors of permanent breakup)
 From First to Last
 The Killers
 Poison the Well
 Pussycat Dolls
 Saving Jane
 Slipknot
 Static-X
 Straylight Run
 t.A.T.u.
 Breaking Benjamin
 The Young Veins

Bands disbanded

 A-ha
 As Tall as Lions
 Backstreet Girls
 Big Star
 Black Box Recorder
 Brooks & Dunn
 Casiotone for the Painfully Alone
 Codeine Velvet Club
 Copeland
 Crime in Stereo
 Crossbreed (band)
 Dio
 Envy on the Coast
 Eyedea & Abilities
 The Fall of Troy
 Far
 Finch
 Gwen Stacy
 Heaven & Hell
 Isis
 The Jesus Lizard
 KSM
 Lexington Bridge
 Little Brother
 Low vs Diamond
 Lydia
 Magna-Fi
 Meese
 Metro Station
 Mudvayne
 The Music
 My Favorite Highway
 The Number Twelve Looks Like You
 Pavement
 Powderfinger
 Pretty Balanced
 Psyclon Nine
 Remy Zero
 Revolting Cocks
 Scary Kids Scaring Kids
 Simply Red
 Sing It Loud
 Sparklehorse
 Supergrass
 Supertramp
 These Arms Are Snakes
 Theater of Tragedy
 Type O Negative
 Voxtrot
 Watership Down
 The Young Veins

Albums released

All releases are LPs unless otherwise stated.

January

January 4
Lana Del Ray by Lana Del Rey

January 5
 Animal by Kesha
 Unbroken by Katharine McPhee
 VH1 Storytellers: Kanye West by Kanye West

January 8
 Into the Roaring by Night Riots

January 11
 Contra by Vampire Weekend
 Superficial by Heidi Montag

January 12
 Ghosts on the Boardwalk by The Bouncing Souls
 Of the Blue Colour of the Sky by OK Go
 Ollusion by Omarion
 Rain or Shine (Live) by O.A.R.

January 14
 Two Song Wedding by Kate Maki

January 18
 The Great City by Revere

January 19
 Behave Yourself (EP) by Cold War Kids
 The Colossus by RJD2
 End Times by Eels
 My Dinosaur Life by Motion City Soundtrack
 Scenes from Hell by Sigh
 Transference by Spoon

January 22
 Time to Burn (Special Edition) by Taking Dawn

January 25
 Teen Dream by Beach House
 Wake Me by Tal & Acacia

January 26
 Ancient Electrons by Analog Rebellion
 Be in Love by Locksley
 Besides, Nothing (B-Sides and Rarities, 2003-2009) by PlayRadioPlay!
 Eggs by Oh No Ono
 The Emptiness by Alesana
 The Greatest Love Songs of all Time by Barry Manilow
 The Infinite Order by Living Sacrifice
 Need You Now by Lady Antebellum
 Realism by Magnetic Fields
 Romance Is Boring by Los Campesinos!
 The Sea by Corinne Bailey Rae
 To the Secrets and Knowledge by Number One Gun
 The Upsides by The Wonder Years
 Veracity by Evacuate Chicago
 2 by Retribution Gospel Choir

January 28
 WWE The Music: A New Day, Vol. 10 by Various Artists

February

February 1
 The Courage of Others by Midlake

February 2
 Adventure Stories (Not Based on Fact?) by ...soihadto...
 Blackjazz by Shining
 Hellbilly Deluxe 2 by Rob Zombie
 The Northern Key by The Northern Key
 Public Square by This Moment in Black History
 Rebirth by Lil Wayne
 The Soft Pack by The Soft Pack
 100 Proof: The Hangover by Statik Selektah
 Who I Am by Nick Jonas & the Administration

February 3
 Wild One (EP) by Rooney

February 5
 Atlas Drugged by Look What I Did
 Mechanized by Fear Factory

February 9
 Another Round by Jaheim
 Haywire by Josh Turner
 Heligoland by Massive Attack
 Ironbound by Overkill
 Odd Blood by Yeasayer
 One Life Stand by Hot Chip
 Screamworks: Love in Theory and Practice by HIM
 Soldier of Love by Sade
 Talking to You, Talking to Me by The Watson Twins

February 14
 Love by Angels & Airwaves

February 16
 The Constant by Story of the Year
 Minor Love by Adam Green
 Peace and Love by Juliana Hatfield

February 23
 Of Men and Angels by The Rocket Summer
 Say Us by Zeus

February 24
 YelloWhite by MellowHype

March

March 2
 Black Ribbons by Shooter Jennings
 Jason Derülo by Jason Derülo
 My Best Days by Danny Gokey
 Permalight by Rogue Wave
 Smoke & Mirrors by Lifehouse
 Victory by DJ Khaled

March 3
 Vital Signs by The Revivalists

March 9
 Battle of the Sexes by Ludacris
 Beat The Devil's Tattoo by Black Rebel Motorcycle Club
 The Brutalist Bricks by Ted Leo and the Pharmacists
 Elect the Dead Symphony (Live album) by Serj Tankian
 Enemy of the World by Four Year Strong
 Gold (EP) by Si*Sé
 Heat Fetish by The Bled
 Pieces of a Real Heart by Sanctus Real
 Plastic Beach by Gorillaz
 Sisterworld by Liars
 The World Is a Thorn by Demon Hunter

March 15
 Planet Anthem by Disco Biscuits

March 16
 Calidosound by Superlitio
 Live on Lansdowne, Boston MA by Dropkick Murphys
 Survival Story by Flobots
 Throne to the Wolves by From First to Last
 Great Danger by The Audition

March 17
 Now is the Hour by Jennifer Rush

March 22
 Option Paralysis by The Dillinger Escape Plan

March 23
 Eparistera Daimones by Triptykon
 Interpreting the Masters Volume 1: A Tribute to Daryl Hall and John Oates by The Bird and the Bee
 My World 2.0 by Justin Bieber

March 26
 Raymond vs. Raymond by Usher
 Sticky & Sweet (Live album) by Madonna

March 30
 Evelyn Evelyn by Evelyn Evelyn
 Paper Tongues by Paper Tongues
 Somewhere Down the Road by Amy Grant
 New Amerykah Part Two (Return of the Ankh) by Erykah Badu

April

April 6
 The Fear Is Excruciating, But Therein Lies the Answer by Red Sparowes
 Shame, Shame by Dr. Dog
 Women and Country by Jakob Dylan
 12 Gauge by Kalmah

April 8
 Air Swell by Chiddy Bang

April 13
 Virtues by Amber Pacific
 Bleeding Through by Bleeding Through
 Congratulations by MGMT
 Jason Castro by Jason Castro
 Leave Your Sleep by Natalie Merchant
 Year of the Black Rainbow by Coheed and Cambria
 18.61 by 108
 $ by Mark Sultan

April 19
 Hang Cool Teddy Bear by Meat Loaf

April 20
 Based on a True Story by Sick of It All
 Blue Sky Noise by Circa Survive
 Cold Day Memory by Sevendust
 Hospital Bomber EP by Heavy Heavy Low Low
 Long Live the Kings by Kottonmouth Kings
 Rise Up by Cypress Hill
 Travellers in Space and Time by The Apples in Stereo

April 21
 Clinging to a Scheme by The Radio Dept.

April 27
 B.o.B Presents: The Adventures of Bobby Ray by B.o.B.

April 30
 The Frozen Tears of Angels by Rhapsody of Fire

May

May 4
 Diamond Eyes by Deftones
 Omni by Minus the Bear
 The Oracle by Godsmack
 White Crosses by Against Me!

May 11
 Plead the Fifth by Taproot
 The Powerless Rise by As I Lay Dying
 Sea of Cowards by The Dead Weather
 Tear the World Down by We Are the Fallen
 Treats by Sleigh Bells

May 14
 Flesh Tone by Kelis

May 17
 Road Salt One by Pain of Salvation

May 18
 The ArchAndroid (Suites II and III) by Janelle Monáe
 Brothers by The Black Keys
 Distant Relatives by Nas & Damian Marley
 Exhibit B: The Human Condition by Exodus
 This Is Happening by LCD Soundsystem

May 21
 Facemelter by Y&T

May 25
 A Promise to Burn by Framing Hanley
 At Night We Live by Far
 Dirty Side Down by Widespread Panic
 The Family Jewels by Marina and the Diamonds
 Iconos by Marc Anthony
 Stone Temple Pilots by Stone Temple Pilots
 Teargarden by Kaleidyscope, Vol. 1: Songs for a Sailor by The Smashing Pumpkins

May 31
 Justice by Molly Hatchet

June

June 1
 Skeletons by Hawthorne Heights
 The Bride Screamed Murder by Melvins

June 7
 The Drums by The Drums

June 8
 Attack Attack! by Attack Attack!
 Bionic by Christina Aguilera
 Eureka by Rooney
 Goon Affiliated by Plies
 Lazarus by Travie McCoy
 Love Like Crazy by Lee Brice
 Miss America by Saving Abel
 The Obsidian Conspiracy by Nevermore
 Shout It Out by Hanson
 Sweet and Wild by Jewel
 Up on the Ridge by Dierks Bentley

June 14
 American Slang by The Gaslight Anthem
 Further by The Chemical Brothers

June 15
 Antifogmatic by Punch Brothers
 Bingo! by Steve Miller Band
 Body Talk Pt. 1 by Robyn
 I'm Alive, I'm Dreaming by The Ready Set
 Imperial by In Fear and Faith
 Laws of Illusion by Sarah McLachlan
 Lustre by Ed Harcourt
 Mojo by Tom Petty and the Heartbreakers
 Now 34 by Various Artists
 On the Rural Route 7609 (Compilation) by John Mellencamp
 Something for Everybody by Devo
 Thank Me Later by Drake
 Time Flies… 1994–2009 by Oasis
 To the Sky by Kevin Rudolf
 The Universe Is Laughing by The Guggenheim Grotto

June 16
 Countdown to Nowhere by Allister

June 18
 We Are Born by Sia
 Can't Be Tamed by Miley Cyrus

June 21
 Recovery by Eminem
 Suddenly by Allstar Weekend

June 22
 Truth or Dare by Automatic Loveletter
 Deth Red Sabaoth by Danzig
 GangRags by Blaze Ya Dead Homie
 Getting Dressed in the Dark by Jaron and the Long Road to Love
 Summer Happiness (Acoustic EP) by David Crowder Band

June 28
 Deep Blue by Parkway Drive

June 29
 Attack of the Wolf King by Haste the Day
 Clockwork by Angelus Apatrida
 Love King by The-Dream
 Streets of Gold by 3OH!3

July

July 6
 Alive by Ed Kowalczyk
 Euphoria by Enrique Iglesias

July 7
 Korn III – Remember Who You Are by Korn

July 12
 Dark Night of the Soul by Danger Mouse and Sparklehorse

July 13
 Black and White by The Maine
 Born Again by Newsboys
 Heart of a Champion by Paul Wall
 Intriguer by Crowded House
 Judge Jerrod & the Hung Jury by Jerrod Niemann
 Masts of Manhatta by Tracy Bonham
 Maya by M.I.A.
 Meridional by Norma Jean
 The Panic Broadcast by Soilwork
 Phoenix by Just Surrender
 Pilot Talk by Curren$y
 Safe Upon the Shore by Great Big Sea
 Stampede by Hellyeah
 The War Report 2: Report the War by Capone-N-Noreaga

July 15
 Best Regards by Buckethead, Bryan, and Melissa

July 20
 Gift Horse by Mose Giganticus
 The Heart by Jimmy Gnecco
 Listening Booth: 1970 by Marc Cohn
 The Only Easy Day Was Yesterday (EP) by 12 Stones
 Rocksteady by Big Head Todd and the Monsters
 Summer Tour EP by Paramore
 Teflon Don by Rick Ross
 We Stitch These Wounds by Black Veil Brides
 100 Miles from Memphis by Sheryl Crow

July 25
 On Melancholy Hill (EP) by Gorillaz

July 27
 Anybody Out There by Rufio
 Collisions and Castaways by 36 Crazyfists
 Crazy for You by Best Coast
 The Darkside Vol. 1 by Fat Joe
 Dre by Soulja Boy
 Formalities by The Spill Canvas
 Fortress by Miniature Tigers
 Mines by Menomena
 Nightmare by Avenged Sevenfold
 Praise & Blame by Tom Jones
 Round Trip by Tony Harnell & The Mercury Train

July 29
 Witchkrieg by Witchery

August

August 3
 King of the Beach by Wavves
 Hear Me Now by Secondhand Serenade
 The Remix by Lady Gaga
 The Suburbs by Arcade Fire

August 17
 Fight the Frequency by American Hi-Fi
 God Willing and the Creek Don't Rise by Ray Lamontagne & The Pariah Dogs
 No Better Than This by John Mellencamp
 The Trouble with Angels by Filter
 Foundling by David Gray

August 24
 Back to Me by Fantasia Barrino
 Sugar by Dead Confederate
 Teenage Dream by Katy Perry

August 31
 Feeding The Wolves by 10 Years
 Asylum by Disturbed
 Fission by Film School
 Only Every Time by The Graduate
 Time for Annihilation by Papa Roach
 Icon (compilation) by Nirvana
 Terrible Things by Terrible Things

September

September 7
 Personal Life by The Thermals
 Seeing Eye Dog by Helmet
 Audio Secrecy by Stone Sour
 Body Talk Pt. 2 by Robyn
 Prepare the Preparations by Ludo
 Everything Under the Sun by Jukebox the Ghost
 Interpol by Interpol
 Kaleidoscope Heart by Sara Bareilles
 Dark is the Way, Light is a Place by Anberlin

September 14
 The Black Pacific by The Black Pacific
 Business Casual by Chromeo
 Flamingo by Brandon Flowers
 The Gracious Few by The Gracious Few
 Hurley by Weezer
 Passion, Pain & Pleasure by Trey Songz
 Poetry for the Poisoned by Kamelot
 Relentless Retribution by Death Angel
 A Thousand Suns by Linkin Park
 Airtight's Revenge by Bilal

September 21
 Hands All Over by Maroon 5
 My Darkest Days by My Darkest Days
 No Gravity by Shontelle
 A Year Without Rain by Selena Gomez & the Scene
 Wake Up! by John Legend and The Roots
 You Get What You Give by Zac Brown Band

September 23
 My Father Will Guide Me up a Rope to the Sky by Swans
 Last Day of Summer by White Denim

September 28
 All About You by Jeremih
 The Dissent of Man by Bad Religion
 Invented by Jimmy Eat World
 In the Absence of Light by Abigail Williams
 Outkasted Outlawz by Hussein Fatal & Nutt-So
 Rehab by Lecrae
 No Chocolate Cake by Gin Blossoms

October

October 5
 Black Swans and Wormhole Wizards by Joe Satriani
 Doo-Wops & Hooligans by Bruno Mars
 Fight or Flight by Emily Osment
 The Other Side of Down by David Archuleta
 Illuminaudio by Chiodos
 Life Turns Electric by Finger Eleven
 There Is Nowhere Left to Go (EP) by Ben Jorgensen

October 11
 B.T.R. by Big Time Rush
 The Preview by Chiddy Bang

October 12
 Turning On by Cloud Nothings
 Charleston, SC 1966 by Darius Rucker
 Playlist: The Very Best of Jessica Simpson by Jessica Simpson

October 19
 Come Around Sundown by Kings of Leon
 Hannah Montana Forever by Hannah Montana
 The Incredible Machine by Sugarland
 Words Words Words by Bo Burnham

October 22
 Omega Wave by Forbidden

October 25
 Speak Now by Taylor Swift

October 26
 Young the Giant (digital) by Young the Giant

October 27
Cardiology by Good Charlotte

November
November 2
 Merry Christmas II You by Mariah Carey
 Burning Bush Supper Club by Bear Hands
 My Kinda Party by Jason Aldean

November 9
 Would It Kill You? by Hellogoodbye
 All The Women I Am by Reba McEntire
 Coal Miner's Daughter: A Tribute To Loretta Lynn by Loretta Lynn
 Ø (Disambiguation) by Underoath

November 16
 What Separates Me from You by A Day to Remember
 Live It Up by Lee DeWyze
 Born Free by Kid Rock
 Nelly 5.0 by Nelly
 Loud by Rihanna
 I Want! I Want! by Walk the Moon

November 22
 The Hits Collection, Volume One by Jay-Z
 Burlesque: Original Motion Picture Soundtrack by Christina Aguilera & Cher
 Danger Days: The True Lives of the Fabulous Killjoys by My Chemical Romance
 Happy Christmas by Jessica Simpson
 My Beautiful Dark Twisted Fantasy by Kanye West
 Cannibal by Ke$ha
 Live in London by Regina Spektor
 Pink Friday by Nicki Minaj
 Pilot Talk 2 by Curren$y.

November 23
 Libra Scale by Ne-Yo
 Teargarden by Kaleidyscope, Vol. 2: The Solstice Bare by The Smashing Pumpkins

November 30
 I Am... World Tour by Beyoncé
 All I Want Is You by Miguel
 Behind Closed Doors by Nu Jerzey Devil
 Doe Or Die: 15th Anniversary by AZ
 Easy 2 Hate by Haystak
 Free Agent by Joell Ortiz
 Only One Flo (Part 1) by Flo Rida
 The Beginning by The Black Eyed Peas
 The DeAndre Way by Soulja Boy
 The Life And Times of Peter Nelson by Copywrite
 Tha Thug Show by Slim Thug
 Like Trees in November by Chapter 14
 Let Freedom Reign by Chrisette Michele
 Love Me Back by Jazmine Sullivan
 Matter of Dayz by Daz Dillinger
 Niggaz With Latitude (NWL) by Deacon The Villain & Sheisty Khrist
 Number One Hits by Tim McGraw

December
December 7
 Just Charlie by Charlie Wilson
 No Mercy by T.I.
 Strip Me by Natasha Bedingfield
December 14
 Basic Instinct by Ciara
 Michael by Michael Jackson
 Last Train to Paris by Diddy-Dirty Money
 Love Letter by R. Kelly
 Now or Never by Tank

December 21
 The Letter by Avant
 Best Night of My Life by Jamie Foxx
 Calling All Hearts by Keyshia Cole
 No Boys Allowed" by Keri Hilson

Best-selling albums in the U.S.
The best-selling records in 2010 in the US according to Nielsen Soundscan:

Top songs on record

Billboard Hot 100 No. 1 Songs
 "Break Your Heart" – Taio Cruz featuring Ludacris (1 week)
 "California Gurls" – Katy Perry featuring Snoop Dogg (6 weeks)
 "Firework" – Katy Perry (2 weeks in 2010, 2 weeks in 2011)
 "Imma Be" – The Black Eyed Peas (2 weeks)
 "Love the Way You Lie" – Eminem featuring Rihanna (7 weeks)
 "Not Afraid" – Eminem (1 week)
 "Nothin' on You" – B.o.B featuring Bruno Mars (2 weeks)
 "Just the Way You Are" – Bruno Mars (4 weeks)
 "Like a G6" – Far East Movement featuring The Cataracs and Dev (3 weeks)
 "OMG" – Usher featuring will.i.am (4 weeks)
 "Only Girl (In the World)" – Rihanna (1 week)
 "Raise Your Glass" – Pink (1 week)
 "Rude Boy" – Rihanna (5 weeks)
 "Teenage Dream" – Katy Perry (2 weeks)
 "Tik Tok" – Kesha (9 weeks)
 "We R Who We R" – Kesha (1 week)
 "What's My Name?" – Rihanna featuring Drake (1 week)

Billboard Hot 100 Top 20 Hits
All songs that reached the Top 20 on the Billboard Hot 100 chart during the year, complete with peak chart placement.

Deaths
January
 January 1 – Lhasa de Sela, 37, singer, breast cancer
 January 1 – Gregory Slay, 40, drummer for Remy Zero, cystic fibrosis
 January 4 – Tony Clarke, 68, The Moody Blues producer
 January 5 – Willie Mitchell, 81, producer and arranger, cardiac arrest
 January 7 – Thomas Sam Davis, a.k.a. Eric Shark, 59, singer for Deaf School, lung failure
 January 12 – Yabby You, 63, reggae singer and producer, brain aneurysm
 January 12 – Dannie Flesher, 58, Wax Trax! Records co-founder, pneumonia
 January 12 – Brian "Damage" Keats, 46, drummer for Misfits, liver cancer
 January 12 – Jimmy O, 35, Haitian musician of Barikad Crew, earthquake victim
 January 13 – Ed Thigpen, 79, jazz drummer
 January 13 – Teddy Pendergrass, 59, R&B singer, colon cancer
 January 13 – Jay Reatard, 29, garage punk singer and guitarist, cocaine toxicity
 January 14 – Bobby Charles, 71, songwriter and swamp pop musician
 January 14 – Chilton Price, 96, songwriter
 January 23 – Earl Wild, 94, pianist, congestive heart disease

February
 February 4 – Helen Tobias-Duesberg, 90, Estonian-American organist and composer
 February 13 – Dale Hawkins, 73, singer-songwriter and guitarist 
 February 14 – Doug Fieger, 57, lead singer of The Knack, cancer
 February 14 – Lee Freeman, 60, guitarist for Strawberry Alarm Clock, cancer
 February 17 – Kathryn Grayson, 88, singer and actress
 February 23 – Chilly B, 47, rapper for Newcleus, stroke
 February 27 – Tom "T-Bone" Wolk, 58, bassist for Hall & Oates, stroke

March
 March 4 – Lolly Vegas, 70, lead singer of Redbone, lung cancer
 March 6 – Mark Linkous, 47, singer and guitarist for Sparklehorse, suicide
 March 10 – Evelyn Dall, singer and actress
 March 17 – Alex Chilton, 59, singer and guitarist for Big Star, heart attack
 March 28 – Herb Ellis, 88, jazz guitarist, Alzheimer's disease

April
 April 14 – Peter Steele, 48, singer and bassist for Type O Negative, heart failure
 April 19 – Guru, 48, rapper for Gangstarr, multiple myeloma
 April 30 – Owsley, 44, singer-songwriter, suicide

May
 May 3 – Chubby Carrier, 63, zydeco musician
 May 3 – Eddie L. Jackson, 63, guitarist for Brenda & The Tabulations
 May 7 – Dave Fisher, 69, singer, musician for The Highwaymen
 May 9 – Lena Horne, 92, singer and actress, heart failure
 May 16 – Hank Jones, 91, jazz pianist and bandleader
 May 16 – Ronnie James Dio, 67, singer for Elf, Rainbow, Black Sabbath, Heaven & Hell and Dio, stomach cancer
 May 19 – Larry Dale, 87, blues musician
 May 23 – Billy Francis, 68, rock keyboardist (Dr. Hook & the Medicine Show)
 May 24 – Paul Gray, 38, bassist for Slipknot
 May 26 – Judy Lynn, 74, country singer
 May 28 – Slim Bryant, 101, country singer-songwriter

June
 June 5 – Tony Peluso, 60, guitarist, record producer
 June 6 – Marvin Isley, 56, bassist for The Isley Brothers
 June 7 – Oliver N'Goma, 51, Gabonese singer and guitarist
 June 7 – Stuart Cable, 40, drummer for The Stereophonics
 June 13 – Jimmy Dean, 81, country singer
 June 15 – Busi Mhlongo, 62, South African singer
 June 16 – Bill Dixon, 84, jazz musician
 June 16 – Garry Shider, 56, guitarist for Parliament-Funkadelic, brain cancer
 June 23 – Pete Quaife, 66, original bassist for The Kinks
 June 24 – Fred Anderson, 81, avant-garde jazz musician
 June 26 – Benny Powell, 80, jazz trombonist with Lionel Hampton and Count Basie
 June 26 – Sergio Vega, 40, Mexican singer, stage name "El Shaka"
 June 27 – Rammellzee, 49, hip hop musician, graffiti artist

July
 July 1 – Ilene Woods, 81, singer, actress
 July 6 – Harvey Fuqua, 80, singer for The Moonglows and record producer
 July 10 – Sugar Minott, 54, reggae singer
 July 11 – Walter Hawkins, 61, gospel singer, pancreatic cancer
 July 12 – Tuli Kupferberg, 86, poet and singer for The Fugs
 July 13 – Olga Guillot, 87, Cuban singer, "Queen of Bolero"
 July 14 – Gene Ludwig, 72, jazz organist
 July 15 – Hank Cochran, 74, country singer-songwriter, brother of Eddie Cochran
 July 15 – Yandé Codou Sène, 78, Senegalese singer
 July 17 – Fred Carter, Jr., 76, guitarist, songwriter, producer
 July 19 – Andy Hummel, 59, bassist for Big Star, cancer
 July 26 – Al Goodman, 63, singer for The Moments and Ray, Goodman & Brown
 July 27 – Ben Keith, 73, guitarist, steel guitarist, musician and producer
 July 31 – Mitch Miller, 99, producer, musician

August
 August 3 – Mitch Jayne, 82, bassist for bluegrass band The Dillards
 August 3 – Bobby Hebb, 72, soul singer
 August 6 – Chris Dedrick, 62, singer for The Free Design
 August 6 – Catfish Collins, 66, guitarist with James Brown, Parliament/Funkadelic and brother to Bootsy Collins
 August 8 – Ted Kowalski, 79, singer with Canadian doo-wop group, The Diamonds
 August 10 – Dana Dawson, 36, soul singer, actress
 August 12 – Richie Hayward, 64, drummer for Little Feat, and with Bonnie Raitt and Eric Clapton among others
 August 14 – Abbey Lincoln, 80, jazz singer, actress
 August 15 – Ahmad Alaadeen, 76, jazz musician
 August 18 – Kenny Edwards, 64, pianist, singer-songwriter. In The Stone Poneys with Linda Ronstadt
 August 19 – Michael Been, 60, singer and guitarist for The Call
 August 20 – Charles Haddon, 22, member of Ou Est Le Swimming Pool
 August 23 – Bill Phillips, 74, country singer

September
 September 8 – Rich Cronin, 36, lead singer and songwriter for LFO
 September 11 – King Coleman, 78, R&B singer
 September 15 – Arrow, 60, Montserratian soca musician
 September 19 – Buddy Collette, 89, jazz saxophonist
 September 20 – Leonard Skinner, 77, schoolteacher and namesake of Lynyrd Skynyrd, Alzheimer's disease
 September 22 – Eddie Fisher, 82, vocalist
 September 27 – Buddy Morrow, 91, aka Moe Zudekoff, jazz bandleader, trombonist

October
 October 8 – Albertina Walker, 81, gospel singer and member of The Caravans
 October 10 – Dame Joan Sutherland, 83, opera soprano
 October 10 – Solomon Burke, 70, R&B singer
 October 13 – General Norman Johnson, 69, singer for Chairmen of the Board, songwriter and producer
 October 16 – Eyedea, 28, rapper and guitarist for Eyedea & Abilities
 October 22 – Denis Simpson, 60, singer for the Canadian band, The Nylons
 October 25 – Gregory Isaacs, 59, reggae singer

December
 December 18 – Bob Demmon, 71, rock and roll guitarist (The Astronauts)
 December 24 – Myrna Smith, 69, singer and songwriter (The Sweet Inspirations)
 December 26 – Teena Marie, 54, white R&B singer

See also
 :Category:2010 in American music
 2010s in music
 2010 in American television

References